This article contains information about the literary events and publications of 1831.

Events
January 1 – William Lloyd Garrison begins publication of the Liberator, an abolitionist periodical in the United States.
February 18 (old style) – Alexander Pushkin marries Natalya Goncharova at the Great Ascension Church on Bolshaya Nikitskaya Street in Moscow.
March 16 – Victor Hugo's historical romantic Gothic novel Notre-Dame de Paris, known in English as The Hunchback of Notre-Dame (completed on January 15), is published by Gosselin in Paris.
March 19 – The play La Cocarde Tricolore by the Cogniard brothers introduces the term "chauvinism".
April 18 – The Sydney Morning Herald is first published.
unknown dates
Convict Henry Savery's autobiographical fiction Quintus Servinton: a tale founded upon incidents of real occurrence is published anonymously in Tasmania, the first Australian novel.
Playwright Manuel Bretón de los Herreros publishes a translation of Tibullus, which secures him an appointment as sub-librarian at the Spanish national library (Biblioteca Pública de Palacio).
Daniel Appleton publishes three religious books in New York City, so originating of the firm of D. Appleton & Company.

New books

Fiction
Honoré de Balzac
La Peau de chagrin
Sarrasine
Le Chef-d'œuvre inconnu
John Brownlow – Hans Sloane: a tale
Selina Davenport – The Queen's Page
Benjamin Disraeli – The Young Duke
Susan Edmonstone Ferrier – Destiny
Nikolai Gogol – Evenings on a Farm Near Dikanka
Catherine Gore
Mothers and Daughters
Pin Money
The School for Coquettes
The Tuileries
Thomas Colley Grattan – Jacqueline of Holland
Ann Hatton – Gerald Fitzgerald
Victor Hugo – The Hunchback of Notre Dame (Notre Dame de Paris)
Thomas Love Peacock – Crotchet Castle
George Sand (as Amantine Aurore Dupin) and Jules Sandeau (as J. Sand) – Rose et Blanche
Mary Shelley – Frankenstein (revised 1-volume edition)

Children
Anne Knight – Mary Gray. A tale for little girls

Drama
Robert Montgomery Bird – Gladiator
Manuel Bretón de los Herreros – Marcela o ¿Cuál de las tres?
Dulduityn Danzanravjaa – Saran khökhöö (Moon Cuckoo; approximate year)
Alfred de Vigny – La Maréchale d'Ancre
Franz Grillparzer – Des Meeres und der Liebe Wellen (Waves of the Sea and of Love)
Victor Hugo – Marion Delorme
James Kenney – The Pledge
James Sheridan Knowles – Alfred the Great
Alexander Pushkin – Boris Godunov (Борис Годунов, published)
John Augustus Stone – Tancred, King of Sicily
Robert Taylor – Swing, or, Who Are the Incendiaries?

Poetry
Thomas Hood – The Dream of Eugene Aram, the Murderer
Giacomo Leopardi – Canti
Edgar Allan Poe – Poems

Non-fiction
Sir John Barrow, 1st Baronet – The Eventful History of the Mutiny and Piratical Seizure of HMS Bounty: Its Cause and Consequences
Washington Irving – Voyages and Discoveries of the Companions of Columbus
John Stuart Mill – The Spirit of the Age
James Cowles Prichard – Eastern Origin of the Celtic Nations
Mary Prince – The History of Mary Prince, A West Indian Slave

Births
January 2 – Justin Winsor, American historian and librarian (died 1897)
January 3 – George Manville Fenn, English novelist and educationalist (died 1909)
January 14 – John Cordy Jeaffreson, English novelist and non-fiction writer (died 1901)
February 25 – Jane G. Austin, American writer (died 1894)
January 26 – Mary Mapes Dodge, American children's writer (died 1907)
February 16 – Nikolai Leskov, Russian novelist and playwright (died 1895)
March 29 – Amelia Edith Huddleston Barr, English novelist and teacher (died 1919)
April 9 – Clara Harrison Stranahan, American author and college founder (died 1905)
April 19 – Mary Louise Booth, American writer, editor, and translator (died 1889)
May 6 – Mary C. Ames, American writer (died 1884)
June 7 – Amelia Edwards, English fiction writer and Egyptologist (died 1892)
June 25 – Harriet Mann Miller, American author, naturalist, and ornithologist (died 1918)
July 3 – Edmund Yates, Scottish writer (died 1894)
July 5 – Cordelia A. Greene, American physician, reformer, benefactor (died 1905)
July 7 – Jane Elizabeth Conklin, American religious writer and poet (died 1914)
August 1 – William Aldis Wright, English writer and literary editor (died 1914)
September 5 – Victorien Sardou, French dramatist (died 1908)
September 12 – Álvares de Azevedo, Brazilian Ultra-Romantic writer (died 1852)
October 7 – Eleanor Kirk, American writer (died 1908)
October 15 – Helen Hunt Jackson, American poet, writer and activist (died 1885)
October 19 – Fanny Murdaugh Downing, American author and poet (died 1894)
unknown date – Nora Perry, American writer (died 1896)

Deaths
January 2 – Barthold Georg Niebuhr, Danish-born German historian (born 1776)
January 14 – Henry Mackenzie, Scottish novelist (born 1745)
January 21 – Ludwig Achim von Arnim, German poet and novelist (heart attack, born 1781)
February 25 – Friedrich Maximilian Klinger, German dramatist and novelist, originator of Sturm und Drang (born 1752)
April 4 – Isaiah Thomas, American publisher (born 1749)
June 30 – William Roscoe, English poet (born 1753)
September 12 – Jippensha Ikku (十返舎 一九), Japanese novelist and humorist (born 1765)
October 2 – José Agostinho de Macedo, Portuguese poet (born 1761)
December 18 – Willem Bilderdijk, Dutch author (born 1756)
December 26 – Henry Louis Vivian Derozio, Indian poet and teacher (born 1809)

Awards
Chancellor's Gold Medal – George Stovin Venables

References

 
Years of the 19th century in literature